Jayson Jones is a German-born runner who represents Belize internationally. He participated on Belize's behalf at the 2008 Summer Olympics in Beijing, and previously represented Belize at the 2000 Summer Olympics in Sydney.

International competitions

References

External links

Living people
1977 births
Belizean male sprinters
Olympic athletes of Belize
Athletes (track and field) at the 2000 Summer Olympics
Athletes (track and field) at the 2008 Summer Olympics
Pan American Games competitors for Belize
Athletes (track and field) at the 2003 Pan American Games
Athletes (track and field) at the 2011 Pan American Games
Commonwealth Games competitors for Belize
Athletes (track and field) at the 2006 Commonwealth Games
World Athletics Championships athletes for Belize
Central American Games silver medalists for Belize
Central American Games bronze medalists for Belize
Central American Games medalists in athletics